This article can be expanded from the   in the Russian Wikipedia

Wild Field (Russian: Дикое поле) is a 2008 Russian film directed by Mikheil Kalatozishvili from a well-known 1990s script by the late Pyotr Lutsik and Aleksey Samoryadov, and stars Oleg Dolin, Roman Madyanov, and Yuriy Stepanov.

Plot
Idealistic and young Doctor Mitya (Oleg Dolin) goes to work in a remote steppe region of Kazakhstan. He brings a modicum of civilization to a barbaric world mired in alcoholism and violence. The physician expects his fiancée to join him there. At last, she arrives, only to let him know that she had met another man whom she wants to marry. An existential crisis ensues. The most sympathetic character in the village brutally stabs the doctor in the stomach.

Cast 
 Oleg Dolin as Mitya
 Roman Madyanov as Ryabov
 Yuriy Stepanov as Fyodor Abramovich
 Alexander Adol'fovich Ilyin as Alexander Ivanovich
 Aleksandr Ilyin, Jr. as  Petro
 Daniela Stoyanovich as Katya
 Irina Butanayeva as Galina
 Ilya Sherbinin as Panko
 Aleksandr Korshunov as Man with cow
 Pyotr Stupin as  Philip I.
 Volodymyr Yavorsky as Shepherd Stepan
 Igor Yavorsky as Shepherd Nikolay Smagin
 Juris Lautsinsh as "Angel"

Reception
Despite the film's slow pacing, Wild Field was widely praised by Russian critics for its cinematography and exploration of existentialist angst. The film won multiple Nika Awards including the "Best Screenplay" (Lutsik and Samoryadov), "Best Actor" (Oleg Dolin) and "Best Music" (Aleksei Aigi) categories.  It also won the "Best Feature Film" Golden Eagle Award. At the 65th Venice International Film Festival the film won the Art Cinema Award.

References

External links
 

2008 films
2008 drama films
2000s Russian-language films
Films set in Kazakhstan
Russian drama films